Rose Massey (c.1845 – 23 July 1883) was a 19th-century English stage actress.

Massey first appeared at the Haymarket Theatre in London in July 1867, playing the role of Mary Meredith in Our American Cousin, but later gained attention in her 1871 performance as Fatima in Blue Beard at the Covent Garden Theatre.  Her New York debut was in February 1869, in The Field of the Cloth of Gold at Wood's Museum.

Massey played a number of roles opposite actor Henry James Montague, whom she followed to the United States and later sued in 1875 for breach of promise to marry.  She claimed to have a son fathered by Montague, and it made a stir when Massey also released "sappy" letters to her from Montague.  That case ended, however, when Montague died in 1878.

In addition to her liaison with Montague, Massey also had a relationship with Alex Henderson (1828-1886) (spouse of burlesque producer Lydia Thompson).  That relationship produced a daughter, Helen Massey.

Massey was also the mother of actress Blanche Massey (born circa 1878).

Massey died of consumption in New York on July 23, 1883 and is buried at Green-Wood Cemetery in Brooklyn.

References

External links
 

Year of birth uncertain
1840s births
1883 deaths
19th-century British actresses
British stage actresses
19th-century deaths from tuberculosis
Tuberculosis deaths in New York (state)